Zubra or Zubrya is a river in Ukraine, 46 km in length, a left tributary of the Dniester River, the basin of Dniester. The Zubra river finds its source in Southern Lviv.

References
 Географічна енциклопедія України: в 3-х томах / Редколегія: О. М. Маринич (відпов. ред.) та ін. — К.: «Українська радянська енциклопедія» імені М. П. Бажана, 1989.

Rivers of Lviv Oblast